Orrin W. Robinson may refer to:

 Orrin W. Robinson (politician) (1834-1907), American politician
 Orrin W. Robinson (philologist), American philologist